CMR University is a private university located in Bangalore, Karnataka, India. CMR University (CMRU) has been established and is governed by the CMR University Act of 2013. CMRU aims to promote and undertake the advancement of university education in law, technical, health, management, life sciences and other allied sectors of higher and professional education. CMR University is also recognized by AIU.

History
CMR University is a private university located in Bangalore, Karnataka, India. CMR University (CMRU) has been established and is governed by the CMR University Act of 2013.

Academics
There are various programs under any disciplines:-
School of Architecture
School of Economics and Commerce
School of Legal Studies
School of Engineering & Technology
School of Management
School of Research & Innovation
School of Social Sciences and Humanities

Campuses 
 CMRU OMBR campus, 5, Chikka Banaswadi Rd, Bhuvanagiri, Lakshmamma Layout, Banaswadi, Bengaluru
 CMRU City Campus, HRBR Layout Block 2, Kalyan Nagar, Bangalore 
 CMRU Main Campus, off Hennur-Bagalur Road, Bangalore.
 CMRIT IT campus,132 Aecs Layout, Itpl Main Road, Kundalahalli, Bengaluru

Affiliation
Like all universities in India, CMR University, Bangalore is recognised by the University Grants Commission (UGC). The University is also a recognised member of Association of Indian Universities.

Rankings

Its constituent college CMR University School of Legal Studies (formerly CMR Law School) was ranked tenth in Outlook Indias  "Top 30 Private Law Colleges In India" of 2022.

Notable alumni 

 Vellaswamy Vanitha, cricketer

References

External links 
 

Private universities in India
Universities in Bangalore
2013 establishments in Karnataka
Educational institutions established in 2013